This is a list of men's national basketball team players who represented Serbia at the EuroBasket, the FIBA Basketball World Cup, and the Summer Olympics. 

Since 2006, the Serbia squad has participated at seven EuroBasket tournaments (2007, 2009, 2011, 2013, 2015, 2017, 2022), three Basketball World Cups (2010, 2014, 2019) and the 2016 Summer Olympics.

Guard Stefan Marković holds the records of eight tournaments played in total and in a row. 

In this list are not included players that: 
 played at the qualification tournaments for named competitions, the Mediterranean Games, and other minor tournaments,
 represented Serbia and Montenegro (formerly FR Yugoslavia).

Key

Players 
Note: This list is correct through the end of the 2019 FIBA Basketball World Cup.

Footers

See also 
 List of Yugoslavia men's national basketball team rosters
 2016 Serbia OQT basketball team
 Serbia at the 2019 FIBA Basketball World Cup qualification
 Serbia at the EuroBasket 2022 qualification

Notes

References

External links

–
Lists of basketball players in Serbia